The 2009–10 Wofford Terriers men's basketball team represented Wofford College during the 2009–10 college basketball season. This was head coach Mike Young's eighth season at Wofford. The Terriers competed in the Southern Conference and played their home games at the Benjamin Johnson Arena. They finished the season 26–9, 15–3 in SoCon play to capture the regular season championship. They also won the 2010 Southern Conference men's basketball tournament to receive the conference's automatic bid to the 2010 NCAA Division I men's basketball tournament. In their first ever tournament, Wofford earned a 13 seed in the East Region where they were defeated in the first round by 4 seed and AP #16 Wisconsin.

Roster
Source

Schedule and results
Source
All times are Eastern

|-
!colspan=9| Regular Season

|-
!colspan=9| 2010 Southern Conference men's basketball tournament

|-
!colspan=10| 2010 NCAA Division I men's basketball tournament

References

Wofford
Wofford
Wofford Terriers men's basketball seasons
Southern Conference men's basketball champion seasons
Wofford Terriers men's basketball
Wofford Terriers men's basketball